Comocladia is a genus of flowering plants in the cashew family, Anacardiaceae. It is native to the Americas, where it is distributed in Mexico, Central America, and the Caribbean. Species are known commonly as maidenplums. The term guao is commonly used to refer to Comocladia species in Cuba and the Dominican Republic.

These are shrubs and trees, mostly unbranched. The leaves are divided into opposite pairs of leaflets that usually have toothed or spiny edges. The inflorescences are panicles of flowers growing from the leaf axils. The plants are polygamodioecious, producing male, female, and bisexual flowers. The sepals are red and the corollas are red or purple. The fruit is a drupe covered in the remnants of the flower calyx. It is fleshy with a yellow, red, or black skin.

The plants produce an exudate that turns black on contact with air. It is known for causing contact dermatitis. Of the 26 species in the genus, 17 have been noted to cause dermatitis.

Taxonomy

Species
Species include:

Comocladia cordata 
Comocladia cuneata – wedgeleaf maidenplum
Comocladia dentata – toothed maidenplum, guao (Cuba, Dominican Republic)
Comocladia dodonaea – poison ash, hogwood (Barbuda), Christmas tree (St. Croix), thumbtack (Tortola), brésillet (Haiti), carrasco (Puerto Rico), guao (Dominican Republic)
Comocladia domingensis
Comocladia ebrenbergii
Comocladia ekmaniana  
Comocladia gilgiana
Comocladia glabra – guao (Cuba), carrasco (Puerto Rico), chicharrón (Dominican Republic)
Comocladia gracilis
Comocladia grandidentata 
Comocladia guatemalensis  
Comocladia hollickii
Comocladia intermedia
Comocladia jamaicensis  
Comocladia macrophylla
Comocladia mollifolia
Comocladia mollissima 
Comocladia palmeri
Comocladia parvifolia 
Comocladia pinnatifolia – guao (Dominican Republic), sibliye (Haiti), maiden plum (Jamaica)
Comocladia platyphylla
Comocladia pubescens  
Comocladia repanda 
Comocladia undulata  
Comocladia velutina – velvet-leaved maiden plum (Jamaica)

References

Anacardiaceae
Anacardiaceae genera